Perdiccas (Perdikkas;  355 BC – 321/320 BC) was a general of Alexander the Great. He took part in the Macedonian campaign against the Achaemenid Empire, and, following Alexander's death in 323 BC, rose to become supreme commander of the imperial army, as well as regent for Alexander's half brother and intellectually disabled successor, Philip Arridaeus (Philip III). 

He was the first of the Diadochi who fought for control over Alexander's empire. In his attempts to establish a power base and stay in control of the empire, he managed to make enemies of critical generals in the Macedonian army—including Antipater, Craterus and Antigonus—who decided to revolt against the regent. In response to this formidable coalition and a provocation from another general, Ptolemy, Perdiccas invaded Egypt, but his soldiers revolted and killed him when the invasion foundered.

Family background
According to Arrian, Perdiccas was the son of the Macedonian nobleman, Orontes, a descendant of the independent princes of the Macedonian province of Orestis. While his actual date of birth is unknown, he would seem to have been of a similar age to Alexander. He had a brother called Alcetas and a sister, Atalantê, who married Attalus.

Hetairos
As the commander of a battalion of the Macedonian phalanx (heavy infantry), Perdiccas distinguished himself during the conquest of Thebes (335 BC), where he was severely wounded. Subsequently, he held an important command in the Indian campaigns of Alexander. In 324 BC, at the nuptials celebrated at Susa, Perdiccas married the daughter of the satrap of Media, a Persian named Atropates. When Hephaestion unexpectedly died the same year, Perdiccas was appointed his successor as commander of the Companion cavalry and chiliarch. As Alexander lay dying in his bed, he gave his ring to Perdiccas.

Diadoch

Following the death of Alexander the Great on the 11 June 323 BC in Babylon, his generals met to discuss their next steps. Perdiccas proposed that a final decision wait until Alexander's wife Roxana, who was pregnant, had given birth. If the child was a boy, then Perdiccas proposed that the child be chosen as the new king. This meant that Perdiccas would be the regent and effectively the ruler of Alexander's empire until the boy was old enough to rule on his own.  Despite misgivings amongst the other generals, most accepted Perdiccas'  proposal.

However, the infantry commander, Meleager, disagreed with Perdiccas' plans.  Meleager argued in favour of Alexander's half brother, Arridaeus, whom he considered first in succession. The infantry supported this proposal with Meleagar's troops willing to fight in favour of Arridaeus.

Regent 

Through the Partition of Babylon, a compromise was reached under which Perdiccas was to serve as "Regent of the Empire" and supreme commander of the imperial army.  Arridaeus and the unborn child of Alexander's wife Roxana (the future Alexander IV of Macedon) were recognized as joint kings. While the general Craterus was officially declared "Guardian of the Royal Family", Perdiccas effectively held this position, as the joint kings were with him in Babylon. Perdiccas soon showed himself intolerant of any rivals and, acting in the name of the two kings, sought to hold the empire together under his own hand. Alexander the Great's second wife, Stateira, was murdered. Perdiccas had Meleager arrested and murdered.

Perdiccas' authority as regent and his control over the royal family was immediately challenged. Perdiccas appointed Leonnatus, one of Alexander's bodyguards or somatophylakes, as satrap of Hellespontine Phrygia on the western coast of Asia Minor. However, instead of assuming that position, Leonnatus sailed to Macedonia when Alexander's sister, Cleopatra, widow of king Alexander I of Epirus, offered her hand to him. Upon learning of this, in spring 322 BC Perdiccas marched the imperial army towards Asia Minor to reassert his dominance as regent. Perdiccas ordered Leonnatus to appear before him to stand trial for disobedience, but Leonnatus died during the Lamian War before the order reached him.

At around the same time, Cynane, Alexander's half-sister, arranged for her daughter, Eurydice II, to marry the joint king, Arridaeus (Philip III). Fearful of Cynane's influence, Perdiccas ordered his brother Alcetas to murder her. The discontent expressed by the army at the plan to murder her and their respect for Eurydice as a member of the royal family persuaded Perdiccas not only to spare her life but to approve of the marriage to Philip III. Despite the marriage, Perdiccas continued to hold control over the affairs of the royal family firmly.

As regent and commander-in-chief, Perdiccas considered it essential to consolidate Alexander's empire.  A critical step in achieving this was to conquer Cappadocia, which remained under Persian rule.  However, Antigonus I Monophthalmus, the Macedonian satrap of Pamphylia and Lycia, was unwilling to support Perdiccas when in 322 BC Perdiccas successfully invaded Cappadocia. When Perdiccas ordered Antigonus to appear before his court, Antigonus fled to Antipater's court in Macedonia.

To strengthen his control over the empire, Perdiccas agreed to marry Nicaea, the daughter of Antipater, the regent of Macedon. However, he broke off the engagement in 322 BC when Olympias, mother of Alexander the Great, offered him the hand of Alexander's full sister Cleopatra. Given the intellectual disability of Philip III and the limited acceptance of the boy, Alexander IV, due to his mother being a Persian, the marriage would have given Perdiccas a claim as Alexander's true successor, not merely as regent.

Civil War and Invasion of Egypt
As a result of these events and actions, Perdiccas earned Antipater's animosity, while Antigonus had reason to fear Perdiccas. Another general, Craterus, was also unhappy at being ignored by Perdiccas despite his important position within the army when Alexander was alive. So Antipater, Craterus and Antigonus agreed to revolt against Perdiccas.

In late 321 BC, Perdiccas intended to send Alexander's body back to Aegae in  Macedonia, the traditional place of burial for the Macedonian Royal Family. Arrhidaeus was chosen to escort the body back to   Macedonia. However, when Alexander's remains were passing through Syria, Ptolemy, the satrap of Egypt, was able to bribe the escort and seize the body. Ptolemy brought Alexander's remains back to Egypt, where they were housed in the city of  Memphis. Perdiccas regarded Ptolemy's action as an unacceptable provocation and decided to invade Egypt. 

Perdiccas marched to attack Ptolemy in Egypt, but when he reached the most easterly tributary of the Nile near Pelusium, he discovered that the opposite side was garrisoned. In response, he marched upstream to find a suitable point to cross, soon coming across a ford which led to the cities of Tanis and Avaris on the other side of the Nile. However, a fort defended by an Egyptian force known as the 'Camel's Rampart' inhibited his advance. Perdiccas then ordered his war elephants and Silver Shield infantry to attack. A larger army under Ptolemy arrived, denying Perdiccas an easy victory. Despite this disadvantage, the attack proceeded, but Perdiccas was overwhelmed and forced to retreat and search for another crossing. He came across one near Memphis, but when he attempted the crossing, the water became deeper, and many of his men drowned.

Death 
Following what was so far a disastrous campaign, a mutiny broke out amongst Perdiccas' troops, who were disheartened by his failure to make progress in Egypt. Perdiccas was murdered by his officers (Peithon, Antigenes, and Seleucus) some time in either 321 or 320 BC. His officers and the rest of his army defected to Ptolemy.

Notes

References

External links

 
 

350s BC births
320s BC deaths
4th-century BC Greek people
4th-century BC viceregal rulers
Regents of Macedonia (ancient kingdom)
Ancient Macedonian generals
Generals of Alexander the Great
Ancient Orestians
Trierarchs of Nearchus' fleet
Ancient Macedonian murder victims
4th-century BC Macedonians
Year of birth unknown